Rusty: A Dog's Tale (Known as Rusty: The Great Rescue on Home Video) is a 1998 family film directed by Shuki Levy and starring Hal Holbrook and Rue McClanahan. The movie was produced by Saban Entertainment and distributed by 20th Century Fox Home Entertainment under the CBS/Fox Video label. Internationally, the movie aired on Fox Kids/Jetix.

Synopsis 
The film is about two orphans named Jory (Blake Foster) and Tess (Danielle Keaton). Their cousins Bart (Charles Fleischer) and Bertha (Laraine Newman) try to take them away from their grandparents (Hal Holbrook and Rue McClanahan) because the two children have trust funds from their late parents. When Bart and Bertha kidnap the newborn puppies, Rusty the dog (Matthew Lawrence) decides to save them.

Partial cast
 Hal Holbrook as Boyd Callahan 
 Rue McClanahan as Edna Callahan 
 Laraine Newman as Bertha Bimini 
 Charles Fleischer as Bart Bimini 
 Blake Foster as Jory 
 Danielle Keaton as Tess
 Beau Billingslea as Sheriff Wilson 
 Michael J. Pagan as Dylan Wilson
 Vincent Schiavelli as  Carney Boss 
 Ken Kercheval as Carl Winthrope 
 Gigi Goyette as Gladys the Waitress 
 James Mathers as Man at Carnival

Voices 
 Rodney Dangerfield as Bandit the Rabbit
 Bobcat Goldthwait as Jet the Turtle
 Doug E. Doug as Turbo the Turtle
 Suzanne Somers as Malley the Dog 
 Patrick Duffy as Cap the Dog
 Matthew Lawrence as Rusty the Dog 
 Charlie Adler as Agent the Snake
 Mary Kay Bergman as Myrtle the Duck   
 Jennifer Darling as Mrs. Cluck 
 Melissa Disney as Boo the Cat 
 Tony Oliver as Rebel the Dog 
 Nick Jameson as Ratchet the Raccoon 
 Frank Welker as Boss Duck
 Jane Singer as Koo the Pigeon
 Rue McClanahan as Latte the Cow/Zelda the Duck

Additional Voices
 Jim Cummings
 Chad Einbinder
 Steve Kramer  
 Wendee Lee
 Julie Maddalena   
 Brianne Siddall 
 Michael Sorich

Reception
Of the film's 2006 re-release on DVD, Andre Dursin of The Aisle Seat offered that the film, a "very cute, impossible-to-dislike tele-film from Shuki Levy and Haim Saban easily trumps their more bombastic children’s fare (like the Power Rangers).

References

External links

1998 direct-to-video films
1998 films
American direct-to-video films
Films about dogs
1998 drama films
American drama films
20th Century Fox direct-to-video films
Saban Entertainment films
Films about orphans
Films directed by Shuki Levy
Films scored by Inon Zur
Films with screenplays by Shuki Levy
Films with screenplays by Shell Danielson
1990s English-language films
1990s American films